Andrew Miller is a physician and scientist noted for his work in H1N1. He was one of the first to note the increased risk to pregnant patients, as well as a recipient of the AMA Foundation Leadership Award.

References

Living people
Year of birth missing (living people)